Lindsay Lawrence is a bronze medalist in the 1985 World Games in taekwondo.

References

External links
 Lindsay Lawrence Taekwondo
 

Year of birth missing (living people)
Living people
English male taekwondo practitioners
World Games medalists in taekwondo
World Games bronze medalists
Competitors at the 1985 World Games
World Taekwondo Championships medalists
European Taekwondo Championships medalists